AFEUR may refer to:
Agrupación de Fuerzas Especiales Antiterroristas Urbanas, a counter-terrorism unit in the National Army of Colombia
Air Forces Europe, a designation for the United States' Third Air Force